National Route 482 is a national highway of Japan connecting between Miyazu, Kyoto and Yonago, Tottori in Japan, with total length has .

See also

References

482
Roads in Hyōgo Prefecture
Roads in Kyoto Prefecture
Roads in Okayama Prefecture
Roads in Tottori Prefecture